Hovey is an unincorporated community in Point Township, Posey County, in the U.S. state of Indiana.

History
A post office was established at Hovey in 1881, and remained in operation until 1902. The community was named after a family of settlers.

Geography

References

Unincorporated communities in Posey County, Indiana
Unincorporated communities in Indiana